Air Combat Command (ACC) is one of nine Major Commands (MAJCOMs) in the United States Air Force, reporting to Headquarters, United States Air Force (HAF) at the Pentagon. It is the primary provider of air combat forces for the Air Force, and it is the direct successor to Tactical Air Command. Air Combat Command is headquartered at Langley Air Force Base, Joint Base Langley–Eustis, Virginia, United States.

ACC directly operates 1,110 fighter, attack, reconnaissance, combat search and rescue, airborne command and control and electronic aircraft along with command, control, computing, communications and intelligence (C4I) systems, Air Force ground forces, conducts global information operations, and controls Air Force Intelligence.

Air Combat Command consists of approximately 74,240 active duty Airmen and 10,610 Department of the Air Force Civilians. When mobilized, more than 49,000 additional Airmen of the Air Force Reserve and the Air National Guard, along with over 700 additional aircraft, are operationally-gained and assigned to ACC, bringing total aircraft to more than 1,800 and number of Airmen to 123,240.

Mission
Air Combat Command's mission is to provide air combat forces to the geographic Unified Combatant Commands. ACC organizes, trains, equips, and maintains combat-ready units for rapid deployment abroad while also ensuring air defense of the United States is strong enough for both peacetime and wartime needs. ACC Numbered Air Forces serve as the air components for United States Central Command, United States Southern Command, and United States Northern Command. ACC augments the forces of the United States European Command, United States Africa Command, United States Pacific Command, and United States Strategic Command.

History
Air Combat Command was created 1 June 1992 after the inactivation of the Tactical Air Command (TAC), Strategic Air Command (SAC) and Military Airlift Command (MAC).  Upon activation, ACC assumed control of all former-TAC fighters, all bombers, reconnaissance platforms, battle management resources, and Intercontinental ballistic missiles (ICBMs). Furthermore, ACC had some KC-135 and KC-10 aerial refueling tankers and C-130 tactical airlift aircraft in its composite, reconnaissance, and other combat wings.  In 1993, control of the ICBM force was transferred to the Air Force Space Command (AFSPC) until transferred again to Air Force Global Strike Command (AFGSC) on 1 December 2009.

Following the inactivation of SAC at Offutt AFB, Nebraska, a new unified command, the United States Strategic Command, was activated at Offutt, created to manage the combined strategic nuclear forces belonging to both the U.S. Air Force and the U.S. Navy.

Historically, Combat Command was an earlier air unit designation.  During 1941 and early 1942, the tactical air units of the War Department, formerly known as the GHQ Air Force, formed the Air Force Combat Command.  The AFCC was dissolved in the reorganization of the United States Army, effective 9 March 1942, which created the United States Army Air Forces as a major command of the Army, which functioned as a de facto independent service branch of the Armed Forces.

Mission Realignments

Combat search and rescue
Not long after activation, ACC underwent organizational and mission changes. The first such major change was the transfer of the combat search and rescue (CSAR) mission from Air Mobility Command to ACC. With the realigning of search and rescue units, ACC gained additional resources, as well as a new mission.  The formal transfer took place on 1 February 1993, when the Air Rescue Service (ARS) was assigned to ACC. On 2 July of the same year, the ARS was disestablished and rescue units became fully integrated in the same manner as other ACC units reporting to numbered air forces.  The USAF Combat Rescue School was subsequently assigned to the 57th Wing at Nellis AFB, Nevada.

Flight training
One of the most significant changes for Air Combat Command resulted from an overhaul of flying training responsibilities. Following its activation, ACC was responsible for aircraft-specific aircrew training, including initial weapon system and continuation training. On 1 July 1993, the 58th and 325th Fighter Wings—F-16 and F-15 training units transferred from ACC to Air Education and Training Command (AETC). Concurrently, Luke AFB, Arizona, and Tyndall AFB, Florida, for which those respective wings were the host units, also moved from ACC to AETC ownership.  However, on 1 October 2012, both Tyndall AFB and the 325th Fighter Wing returned to the control of ACC.

Tanker and airlift
The next major organizational change resulted from a fine-tuning of aerial refueling and airlift resources. From its activation, Air Combat Command had assumed ownership of some C-130 Hercules theater airlift assets and KC-10 Extender and KC-135 Stratotankers. Just as ownership of overseas C-130 resources had already been transferred to USAFE and PACAF commanders, it was decided that all C-130s based in the CONUS would be under the control of ACC, while at the same time, almost all KC-135 tankers would be assigned to Air Mobility Command.

There was historical precedent for the reassignment of C-130s to Air Combat Command. During the earliest days of Tactical Air Command (TAC), the command had carried out the "tactical" or combat airborne aspect of airlift operations, leaving the "strategic" or logistical mission to Military Air Transport Service, later redesignated Military Airlift Command (the precursor of today's Air Mobility Command) in 1966. The tactical airlift mission included logistical airlift, airborne operations, aeromedical evacuation, and air support for special operations. This division of the airlift mission continued until 1 December 1974, when TAC transferred its CONUS-based tactical airlift units, including Air Force Reserve and Air National Guard tactical airlift units, to Military Airlift Command (MAC). MAC gained the overseas units from theater commands on 31 March 1975.

On 1 October 1993, all Air Mobility Command C-130s with the exception of those permanently under United States Air Forces in Europe (USAFE) and Pacific Air Forces (PACAF) regions were transferred to ACC, while USAFE and PACAF assumed control of the C-130 permanently based in their respective geographic regions.  Concurrently, all KC-10 tankers and all KC-135 tankers except those at Mountain Home AFB, Idaho, which supported the fighter and bomber aircraft of the composite wing stationed there, transferred to AMC. ACC also retained two KC-135s at Offutt AFB Nebraska and Grand Forks AFB, North Dakota under ACC control until transferring them to AMC on 1 October 1993.  McConnell AFB, Kansas; Fairchild AFB, Washington; and their respective air refueling wings were also transferred to AMC in January 1994 and July 1994, respectively.

In 1997, a subsequent USAF reorganization of ACC and AMC resulted in all CONUS-based C-130 theater airlift aircraft being reassigned from ACC back to AMC.  This change also shifted operational claimancy for all "slick" theater airlift mission C-130s in the Air Force Reserve and CONUS-based Air National Guard.  USAFE and PACAF C-130 assets remained in those respective MAJCOMs to include PACAF's operational claimancy for Alaska Air National Guard C-130 and HC-130 assets.

Operational deployments
In Southwest Asia, Air Combat Command provided active duty and reserve component forces for the follow-on to Operation Desert Storm and the establishment of Operation Southern Watch to deter Iraqi aggression. In October 1994, ACC also demonstrated its ability to react quickly to the buildup of Iraqi troops near the border of Kuwait. In addition, ACC, from its inception, has provided indispensable support to counter-drug operations, including Airborne Warning and Control System (AWACS), reconnaissance and fighter aircraft, as well as radar and connectivity assets.

Participation in humanitarian operations has also been a recurring theme. Air Combat Command supported the humanitarian efforts of the United States Air Forces in Europe (USAFE), deploying active duty and air reserve component forces to Provide Promise and Deny Flight in Eastern Europe and Operation Provide Comfort out of Incirlik AB, Turkey. Provide Promise offered humanitarian relief airlift support to the city of Sarajevo, while Deny Flight enforced the "no-fly" zone against Serb air attacks on Bosnian civilians. Operation Provide Comfort, another humanitarian operation, also provided relief to Kurdish inhabitants of northern Iraq who had undergone fierce repression by the Iraqi government.

In addition, ACC supported United States Atlantic Command's humanitarian relief to Haitian refugees associated with Operation GTMO at Guantanamo Bay Naval Base, Cuba. Similarly, the command supported Operation Safe Haven and the processing of Cuban refugees during the latter part of the summer of 1994. Across the Atlantic, Air Combat Command units participated in Operation Restore Hope, largely an Air Mobility Command humanitarian operation intended to provide food for Somalia. Also, ACC regular and ACC-gained Air National Guard C-130 units deployed to Uganda and Kenya to participate in Operation Support Hope. This operation, conducted by the United States European Command, comprised part of the United Nations effort to provide humanitarian relief to victims of the civil war in Rwanda.

In keeping with its global responsibilities, ACC initiated a series of "Global Power" missions in 1993. ACC's bomber wings are required to perform out-of-CONUS training flights to demonstrate the capability to perform their "quick reaction" worldwide mission. On one of the global power missions, two B-1 Lancer aircraft of the 28th Bomb Wing, Ellsworth AFB, South Dakota, set a B-1 flying time record on the first leg of their round-the-world flight, 11–13 August 1993. The following year, two B-52s from the 2d Bomb Wing, Barksdale AFB, Louisiana, circumnavigated the globe in 47.2 hours, the longest jet aircraft flight in history.

Global war on terrorism
Air Combat Command units flew operational missions during the 2002 Operation Enduring Freedom – Afghanistan (OEF-A) and the 2003 invasion of Iraq, Operation Iraqi Freedom.

The task of developing a comprehensive listing of ACC units present in Iraq, Afghanistan and other combat areas is particularly difficult as the events of 11 September 2001 and the Global War on Terrorism has made such an effort significantly difficult. The USAF seeks to improve operational security (OPSEC) and to deceive potential enemies as to the extent of American operations, therefore a listing of which units deploying where and when is unavailable.

However, it is certain that ACC units are actively flying combat missions in the Southwest Asia theater of operations.

Predecessor units merged into Air Combat Command 1992

 Strategic Air Command
 2d Bomb Wing
 Barksdale AFB, LA
 5th Bomb Wing
 Minot AFB, ND
 7th Bomb Wing
 Carswell AFB, TX (Xfer to Dyess AFB, TX on 1 October 1993)
 9th Reconnaissance Wing
 Beale AFB, CA
 28th Bomb Wing
 Ellsworth AFB, SD
 42d Bomb Wing
 Loring AFB, ME (Base and wing BRAC Inactivated, 30 September 1994)
 44th Missile Wing
 Ellsworth AFB, SD (Xfer to Air Force Space Command, 1 July 1993)
 55th Strategic Reconnaissance Wing
 Offut AFB NE
 90th Missile Wing
 F E Warren AFB, WY (Xfer to Air Force Space Command, 1 July 1993)
 91st Missile Wing
 Minot AFB, ND (Xfer to Air Force Space Command, 1 July 1993
 92d Bomb Wing
 Fairchild AFB WA (Xfer to Air Mobility Command, 1 July 1994)
 93d Wing
 Castle AFB, CA (Base and wing BRAC Inactivated, 30 September 1995)
 96th Wing
 Dyess AFB, TX (Wing only BRAC Inactivated, 1 October 1993)
 319th Bombardment Wing
 Grand Forks AFB, ND (Xfer to Air Mobility Command as 319 ARW, 1 October 1993)
 321st Missile Wing
 Grand Forks AFB, ND (Xfer to Air Force Space Command, 1 July 1993)
 341st Missile Wing
 Malmstrom AFB, MT (Xfer to Air Force Space Command, 1 July 1993)
 351st Missile Wing
 Whiteman AFB, MO (Xfer to Air Force Space Command, 1 July 1993)
 379th Wing
 Wurtsmith AFB, MI (Base and wing BRAC Inactivated, 15 June 1993)
 384th Bomb Wing
 McConnell AFB, KS (Wing only BRAC Inactivated; xfer to 384th Bomb Group, 1 October 1994)
 410th Wing
 K. I. Sawyer AFB, MI (Base and wing BRAC Inactivated, 30 September 1995)
 416th Wing
 Griffiss AFB, NY (Base and wing BRAC Inactivated, 30 September 1995)
 509th Bombardment Wing
 Whiteman AFB, MO
 Military Airlift Command
 314th Airlift Wing
 Little Rock AFB, AR
 Tactical Air Command
 1st Fighter Wing
 Langley AFB, VA
 4th Fighter Wing
 Seymour Johnson AFB, NC

 23d Fighter Wing
 Base and wing BRAC Inactivated at England AFB, LA; reactivated as 23d Wing, Pope AFB, NC)
 27th Fighter Wing
 Cannon AFB, NM
 31st Fighter Wing
 Homestead AFB, FL (Moved WOPE to Aviano AB Italy on 1 April 1994 and assigned to USAFE)
 33d Fighter Wing
 Eglin AFB, FL
 35th Fighter Wing
 George AFB, CA (Base and wing BRAC Inactivated, 15 December 1992)
 37th Fighter Wing
 Tonopah AP, NV (Wing Inactivated 8 July 1992; F-117s xfer to 49 FW, Holloman AFB, NM)
 49th Fighter Wing
 Holloman AFB, NM
 53d Wing
 Eglin AFB, FL
 56th Fighter Wing
 MacDill AFB, FL (Moved WOPE to Luke AFB, AZ on 1 April 1994; reassigned to AETC)
 57th Fighter Wing
 Nellis AFB, NV
 58th Fighter Wing
 Luke AFB, AZ (Moved WOPE to Kirtland AFB, NM on 1 April 1994
 Reassigned to AETC as 58th Special Operations Wing)
 67th Reconnaissance Wing
 Bergstrom AFB, TX (Base and wing BRAC Inactivated, 30 September 1993)
 85th Wing
 NAS Keflavik, Iceland (Wing only BRAC Inactivated, 31 May 1993)
 325th Fighter Wing
 Tyndall AFB, FL (Reassigned to AETC 1 July 1993; rejoined ACC 1 October 2012)
 347th Fighter Wing
 Moody AFB, GA (Reassigned to AFSOC as 347 RQW 1 October 2003; merged into ACC 23 WG, 1 October 2006)
 354th Fighter Wing
 Myrtle Beach AFB, SC (BRAC Inactivated, 31 March 1993)
 355th Fighter Wing
 Davis-Monthan AFB, AZ
 363d Fighter Wing
 Shaw AFB, SC (Inactivated 30 December 1993; replaced by 20th Fighter Wing, 30 December 1993)
 366th Fighter Wing
 Mountain Home AFB, ID
 388th Fighter Wing
 Hill AFB, UT
 475th Weapons Evaluation Group
 Tyndall AFB, FL
 507th Air Control Wing
 Shaw AFB, SC (Wing only BRAC Inactivated, 12 June 1993)
 552d Air Control Wing
 Tinker AFB OK
 602d Air Control Wing
 Davis-Monthan AFB, AZ (Wing only BRAC Inactivated, 15 June 1992)

Wings and groups
, Air Combat Command consisted of the following units:

 United States Air Force Warfare Center (USAFWC)
 HQ: Nellis AFB, Nevada
 53d Wing, Eglin AFB, Florida
 Includes 53d Test and Evaluation Group, Nellis AFB, Nevada
 and 53d Weapons Evaluation Group, Tyndall AFB, Florida
 57th Wing, Nellis AFB, Nevada
 Nevada Test and Training Range, Nellis AFB, Nevada
 Utah Test and Training Range, Hill AFB, Utah
 99th Air Base Wing, Nellis AFB, Nevada
 505th Command and Control Wing, Hurlburt Field, Florida

 First Air Force (AFNORTH)
 HQ: Tyndall AFB, Florida
 Eastern Air Defense Sector, Rome, New York (former Griffiss AFB)
 Western Air Defense Sector, McChord AFB, Washington
 701st Air Defense Squadron, Tyndall AFB, Florida
 702d Computer Systems Squadron, Tyndall AFB, Florida
 722d Air Control Squadron, North Bay (CFB North Bay), Canada

 Ninth Air Force (AFCENT)
 HQ: Shaw AFB, South Carolina

 Twelfth Air Force (AFSOUTH)
 HQ: Davis–Monthan AFB, Arizona

 Fifteenth Air Force
 HQ: Shaw AFB, South Carolina
 1st Fighter Wing (F-22A, T-38A), Langley AFB, Virginia
 4th Fighter Wing (F-15E), Seymour Johnson AFB, North Carolina
 20th Fighter Wing (F-16C/D), Shaw AFB, South Carolina
 Includes Poinsett Electronic Combat Range, South Carolina
 23d Wing (HH-60, HC-130J, A/OA-10C), Moody AFB, Georgia
 Includes Avon Park Air Force Range, Florida

 93d Air Ground Operations Wing, Moody AFB, Georgia
 325th Fighter Wing (F-22A, T-38A), Tyndall AFB, Florida
 355th Fighter Wing (A/OA-10C), Davis-Monthan AFB, Arizona
 366th Fighter Wing (F-15E), Mountain Home AFB, Idaho
 388th Fighter Wing (F-35A), Hill AFB, Utah
 432d Wing (MQ-1, MQ-9), Creech AFB, Nevada
 461st Air Control Wing (E-8C), Robins AFB, Georgia
 552d Air Control Wing (E-3B/C), Tinker AFB, Oklahoma
 633d Air Base Wing, Langley AFB, Virginia
 495th Fighter Group, Shaw AFB, South Carolina

 Sixteenth Air Force
 HQ: Lackland AFB, Texas
 9th Reconnaissance Wing (U-2S, RQ-4, MC-12), Beale AFB, California
 55th Wing (EC/OC/WC/RC-135), Offutt AFB, Nebraska
 Includes 55th Electronic Combat Group (EC-130H), Davis-Monthan AFB, Arizona
 67th Cyberspace Wing, Lackland AFB, Texas
 Includes 567th Cyberspace Operations Group, Scott AFB, Illinois
 70th Intelligence, Surveillance and Reconnaissance Wing, Fort Meade, Maryland
 319th Reconnaissance Wing, Grand Forks AFB, North Dakota
 363d Intelligence, Surveillance and Reconnaissance Wing, Langley AFB, Virginia
 480th Intelligence, Surveillance and Reconnaissance Wing, Langley AFB, Virginia
 557th Weather Wing, Offutt AFB, Nebraska
 616th Operations Center, Lackland AFB, Texas
 688th Cyberspace Wing, Lackland AFB, Texas
 Includes 5th Combat Communications Group, Robins AFB, Georgia
 Also includes 38th Cyberspace Engineering Installation Group, Tinker AFB, Oklahoma
 Air Force Technical Applications Center, Patrick Space Force Base, Florida

In 2009, responsibility for nuclear-capable bombers, specifically the B-2 Spirit and the B-52 Stratofortress, along with their associated units, bases and personnel, were transferred from ACC to the newly established Air Force Global Strike Command (AFGSC). 

On 1 February 2010, the Eighth Air Force transferred to the Air Force Global Strike Command.  The 7th Bomb Wing at Dyess Air Force Base, and the 28th Bomb Wing at Ellsworth Air Force Base also transferred to AFGSC on 1 October 2015, thus, ending 23 years of operational bomber service in ACC.

In October 2019 units from Twenty-Fourth Air Force and Twenty-Fifth Air Force were merged into the reactivated Sixteenth Air Force. Sixteenth Air Force headquarters is based at Joint Base San Antonio-Lackland, Texas.

In August 2020 units from Ninth Air Force and Twelfth Air Force were realigned under the reactivated Fifteenth Air Force. Fifteenth Air Force headquarters is based at Shaw Air Force Base, South Carolina.

In addition, units from Air Force Reserve Command's Tenth Air Force, and numerous other state and District of Columbia Air National Guard units are allocated to Air Combat Command when activated to federal service.

Aircraft
:

 Attack
 Fairchild Republic A-10C Thunderbolt II
 General Atomics MQ-1 Predator
 General Atomics MQ-9 Reaper
 Fighters
 McDonnell Douglas F-15C/D Eagle
 McDonnell Douglas F-15E Strike Eagle
 General Dynamics F-16C/D Fighting Falcon
 Lockheed Martin F-22A Raptor
 Lockheed Martin F-35A Lightning II
 Combat Search and Rescue
 Lockheed HC-130P Combat King and HC-130J Combat King II

 Electronic Attack & Command and Control
 E-3B, E-3C and E-3G Sentry
 E-4B Nightwatch
 E-8C JSTARS
 E-9A Widget
 E-11A
 EC-130H Compass Call
 EC-130J Commando Solo
 EQ-4B Global Hawk
 Reconnaissance
 Boeing OC-135;RC-135S/U/V/W;TC-135;WC-135
 Northrop Grumman RQ-4 Global Hawk
 Lockheed U-2S Dragon Lady
 Beechcraft MC-12 Liberty
 Lockheed Martin RQ-170 Sentinel
 Helicopter
 Sikorsky HH-60G Pave Hawk
 Trainer
 Northrop T-38A, AT-38B and T-38C Talon

Lineage
 Constituted as Air Combat Command and activated on 1 June 1992
 Consolidated with Tactical Air Command on 26 September 2016

Assignments
 Headquarters, United States Air Force, 1 June 1992 – present

Stations
 Langley Air Force Base, Hampton, Virginia, 1 June 1992 – present

Major components
 Air Forces
 First Air Force: 1 June 1992 – present
 Second Air Force: 1 June 1992 – 1 July 1993
 Transferred to Air Education and Training Command
 Eighth Air Force: 1 June 1992 – 2009
 Transferred to Air Force Global Strike Command, 2009
 Ninth Air Force: 1 June 1992 – present
 Twelfth Air Force: 1 June 1992 – present
 Fifteenth Air Force: 20 August 2020 – present
 Sixteenth Air Force: 11 October 2019 – present
 Twentieth Air Force: 1 June 1992 – 1 July 1993
 Transferred to Air Force Space Command, 1993
 Transferred to Air Force Global Strike Command, 2009
 Twenty-Fourth Air Force: 17 July 2018 – 11 October 2019
 Twenty-Fifth Air Force: 29 September 2014 – 11 October 2019
 Centers
 Air & Space Expeditionary Force Center: 1 October 2002 – 29 August 2006
 Aerospace Command and Control & Intelligence, Surveillance and Reconnaissance (later, Air Force Command and Control & Intelligence, Surveillance and Reconnaissance) Center (see Agencies below): 29 July 1997 – 30 April 2002.  On 17 June 2010, the GCIC was officially redesignated the Air Force Command and Control Integration Center or AFC2IC as a direct reporting unit to Air Combat Command (ACC).
 Air Force Contingency Supply Support Office (later, Air Force Contingency Supply Squadron; ACC Regional Supply Squadron; Combat Air Forces Logistics Support Center): 12 June 1992 – 1 July 1994; 1 December 1998 – present
 Air Warfare Center (later, USAF Warfare Center): 1 June 1992 – present
 Air Force Network Integration Center: 17 July 2018 – present
 Air Force Spectrum Management Office: 17 July 2018 – present
 Agencies
 Air and Space Command and Control Agency (later, Aerospace Command and Control Agency; Aerospace Command and Control & Intelligence, Surveillance and Reconnaissance Center; Air Force Command and Control & Intelligence, Surveillance and Reconnaissance Center): 29 July 1997 – 30 April 2002.
 Air Intelligence Agency: 1 February 2001 – 8 August 2006
 Groups
 Air Combat Command (ACC) Air Force Targeting Center: 2008–present
 Air Combat Command (ACC) Communications Group: 1 June 1992 – present
 Air Combat Command (ACC) Logistics Support Group: 1 July 1994 – 16 September 1999.

source for lineage, assignments, stations, components

List of commanders

See also
U.S. Armed Forces operations commands
 United States Army Forces Command 
 United States Marine Corps Forces Command
 United States Fleet Forces Command
 Space Operations Command

References

External links
 Air Combat Command website
 Air National Guard website
 Tenth Air Force website

Major commands of the United States Air Force
Military units and formations in Virginia
Military units and formations established in 1992